Shermaine Santiago (born February 16, 1980 in Manila, Philippines) is a Filipina actress, TV show host, and singer. She appeared in a lot of hit TV shows from GMA Network such as Best Friends, Beh Bote Nga, Te Amo, Maging Sino Ka Man, Mulawin, Impostora, MariMar, Paroa: Ang Kuwento ni Mariposa, Anna KareNina and Carmela. She was also a co-host in the longest-running late-night variety TV show in the Philippines, Walang Tulugan with the Master Showman in which she showcase her talent in singing and hosting. Along with German Moreno and John Nite, she was one of the longest-serving hosts of the show. Santiago is also currently appearing in the hit TV show, Kapag Nahati ang Puso.

Career
A graduating Broadcasting major in Centro Escolar University, Santiago started singing in hotels and doing lounge performances at the age 16. Around the same time, she appeared in various commercials and decided to try the show business. She auditioned for GMA Network and GMA Network made her sign an exclusive six-month contract. She was given guesting projects in different drama shows and a regular role on the youth-oriented variety show Best Friends. She later appeared in the comedy sitcom Beh Bote Nga.

In 2012, Santiago got her breakthrough role in the drama-fantasy TV show, Paroa: Ang Kuwento ni Mariposa, where she portrayed the villainous femme fatale butterfly Talisay. Her character was killed in a massive explosion in the sky. According to her fellow Walang Tulugan co-host, John Nite, the ratings of the show got higher when Santiago and the host of Walang Tulugan German Moreno started appearing in the show.

In 2013, for her 32nd birthday, she performed Adele's song "Someone Like You" on Walang Tulugan with the Master Showman and received a standing ovation from the audience.

Personal life
Santiago has a son, Tristan Reese M. Eugenio. Her son was baptized by Fr. Steve Tyran at the St. Benedict Church in Don Antonio Heights in Quezon City.
Reese has a channel on YouTube called Reese TV Music, where he normally posts music covers and memes on his channel. Santiago has a channel also named Menggay Channel. The newspaper that publicized the story of Reese's baptism,  misspelled it. If Googled, his name is displayed as Tristan Reefer.
The son's father, Neil Eugenio and Santiago were never married. Eugenio left Santiago's family when her son was three years old. In 2019, Eugenio reported in an interview with his then-partner Harlene Bautista that he planned to put up restaurants and resorts all over Manila, although he had no money to do so.

Filmography

Television

Films

Theatre

References

External links

Filipino film actresses
1980 births
Living people
Actresses from Manila
Singers from Manila
Centro Escolar University alumni
21st-century Filipino singers
21st-century Filipino women singers
GMA Network personalities